The School of Natural Sciences (SNS), formerly Centre for Advanced Mathematics and Physics (CAMP), is a department and research center of the National University of Sciences and Technology (Pakistan). Established in May 2004, SNS offers the Bachelor of Science (BS), Master of Science (MS)/Master of Philosophy (MPhil) and Doctor of Philosophy (PhD) in natural science subjects; Physics, Chemistry and Mathematics.

See also
National University of Sciences and Technology (Pakistan)

References

External links
 SNS official website
 NUST official website

National University of Sciences & Technology
Universities and colleges in Islamabad